ZICO Beverages is an American beverage company that manufactures coconut water.

In 2013, ZICO became majority owned by The Coca-Cola Company, which it retained for the next seven years. In January 2021 during the COVID-19 pandemic and after years of declining sales, the company was sold back to its founder, Mark Rampolla, through PowerPlant Ventures.

History
ZICO was founded in 2004 by Mark Rampolla after being introduced to coconut water as a Peace Corps volunteer in Central America.

In 2009, The Coca-Cola Company purchased a minority stake in ZICO and increased that to a majority stake in 2012.

In 2013, Coca-Cola purchased the outstanding stake, acquiring ZICO in the process.

In 2020, Coca-Cola announced it would discontinue ZICO by the end of the year.

In January 2021, PowerPlant Ventures announced their acquisition of ZICO coconut water from The Coca-Cola Company. The brand's ownership has come full circle, as PowerPlant Ventures was co-founded and is co-led by Mark Rampolla, who was behind ZICO's initial 2004 launch.

Ingredients
ZICO contains pure coconut water - often in concentrate form, which has been the source of a litigation.

Flavors 
ZICO's coconut water comes in a variety of flavors including natural, chocolate, jalapeno mango, and watermelon raspberry.

References

Drink companies based in California
Drink companies of the United States